MOBO Awards 2021 ceremony was held at the Coventry Building Society Arena in Coventry on 5 December 2021. The ceremony streamed live on YouTube and the highlights of the ceremony were shown on BBC One three days later.

The nominees were announced on 11 November 2021, led by rapper Dave with five nominations. Central Cee and Wizkid won the most awards of the night with two each. The ceremony honoured former heavyweight boxer Frank Bruno for his work in raising awareness of mental health issues.

Performers
The performers for the ceremony were announced on 24 November 2021.

Winners and nominees
Winners appear first and highlighted in bold.

References

External links
Official site

British music awards
2021 awards in the United Kingdom